The Indian Institutes of Management (IIMs) are central government-owned-public business schools for management offering undergraduate, postgraduate, doctoral and executive programmes along with some additional courses in the field of business administration. The establishment of IIMs was initiated by Jawaharlal Nehru, the first prime minister of India, based on the recommendation of the Planning Commission of India.

IIMs were declared institutions of national importance by the Ministry of Human Resource Development (MHRD) after the passage of Indian Institutes of Management Act, 2017. By this act, IIMs were given more autonomy in handling their day-to-day operations. The act changed the IIM governing body from the IIM council to an IIM coordination forum. IIMs were granted much leeway to decide their courses, fees and other related matters. Top IIMs—such as IIM Ahmedabad, IIM Bangalore, IIM Calcutta and IIM Indore —have achieved top 10 rankings among management schools, according to the National Institutional Ranking Framework (NIRF) used by the HRD minister of India.

The full time Master of Business Administration (MBA) programmes, are the flagship programmes across all IIMs. The full time MBA degree is offered as a two-year Post Graduate Programme in Management (PGP) or the one-year global MBA (EPGP, PGPX,PGPEX,PGPEX-VLM, PGP-BL & IPMX). Seven leading IIMs IIM Ahmedabad, Bangalore, Calcutta, Indore, Shillong, Lucknow and Kozhikode offer the one year MBA as a full-time programme that follows the global MBA norms. Some IIMs also offer a two-year part time (executive) MBA for graduates with more work experience.

IIMs only offered diplomas at the end of the full time programmes However, since the passage of IIM Act 2017, all IIMs have started offering Master of Business Administration (MBA).  Some IIMs offer the Fellow Programme in Management (FPM), a doctoral programme. The fellowship is considered to be equivalent to a DBA globally. Most IIMs also offer short-term Executive MBA courses and part-time programmes. Some IIMs also offer unique programs, like IIM Bodh Gaya, IIM Rohtak, IIM Ranchi and IIM Indore's Five Year Integrated Programme in Management and IIM Lucknow's Working Managers' Programme of two years.

Institutes

History 
After India became independent in 1947, the Planning Commission was entrusted to oversee and direct the development of the nation. India grew rapidly in the 1950s, and in the late 1950s the Commission started facing difficulties in finding suitable managers for the large number of public sector enterprises that were being established in India as a part of its industrial policy. To solve this problem, the Planning Commission in 1959 invited Professor George Robbins of UCLA to help in setting up an All India Institute of Management Studies. Based on his recommendations, the Indian government decided to set up two elite management institutes, named Indian Institutes of Management. Calcutta and Ahmedabad were chosen as the locations for the two new institutes.

The institute at Calcutta was established first, on 13 November 1961, and was named Indian Institute of Management Calcutta or IIM Calcutta. It was set up in collaboration with the MIT Sloan School of Management, the government of West Bengal, the Ford Foundation, and Indian industry. The institute at Ahmedabad was established in the following month and was named the Indian Institute of Management Ahmedabad. Like MIT Sloan in the case of IIM Calcutta, Harvard Business School played an important role in the initial stages of IIM Ahmedabad.

In 1972, a committee headed by Ravi J. Matthai took note of the success of the two established IIMs and recommended the setting up of two more IIMs. Based on the committee's recommendation, a new IIM, originally intended to cater exclusively to the needs of public sector enterprises, was established in Bangalore (IIM Bangalore) the next year. In 1981, the first IIM Review Committee was convened to examine the progress of the three existing IIMs and to make recommendations. The committee noted that the three IIMs were producing around 400 PGP graduates every year and that they had reached their optimum capacity. It proposed the opening of two more IIMs to meet the rising demand for management professionals. It also recommended expanding the Fellowship programmes, similar to PhD programmes, to meet the growing demand for faculty in management schools in India. The fourth IIM, IIM Lucknow, was established in 1984 based on the committee's recommendation.

Two more IIMs, the fifth and sixth, were established at Kozhikode and Indore in 1996. IIM Shillong was the seventh IIM to be established, following a 2005 decision by the Government of India; its foundation stone was laid on 1 December 2007; and its first academic session was 2008–09. Since 2007, fourteen new IIMs have been set up, bringing the total number of IIMs to 20, IIM-Jammu being the latest one, starting in 2016.

The Union Cabinet, on 24 January 2017, approved the bill that became the Indian Institutes of Management Act, 2017, which declares IIMs as Institutes of National Importance and enables them to grant degrees and to further make other important changes to the institute. The IIM bill was passed by the Lok Sabha on 28 July 2017 and by the Rajya Sabha on 19 December 2017. After receiving presidential assent, the IIM bill became an Act on 31 December 2017.

Academics 
The IIMs mainly offer undergraduate/postgraduate,  postgraduate, doctoral, and executive education programmes. Some programmes offered by all IIMs are similar; however, some IIMs offer unique programmes for specialised purposes.

Postgraduate Management Programme

Two year MBA (PGP) 
All IIMs offer a two-year full-time Post Graduate Programme in Management (PGP), equivalent to a Master of Business Administration (MBA) degree. The programme is considered the flagship programme of IIMs, and awards the Master of Business Administration (MBA)  to successful candidates. Since 2018, all the IIMs have started granting MBA degrees for this flagship program.

This programme is usually structured into six trimesters spread across two years, starting in June and running until April of the second year. The first-year coursework generally consists of core courses in various management disciplines, while in the second year students are allowed to select courses from an exhaustive list of electives. The PGP is a general, fully integrated management programme with no specialisation, and typically includes courses in accounting, behavioural science, finance, economics, human resource management (HRM), management sciences and information technology, marketing, business operations, business mathematics, public policy, statistics and decision analysis, strategy, and general management. The 2-year MBA programmes offered by IIMs at Bangalore, Ahmedabad, Calcutta, Udaipur, Lucknow and Indore and are often termed as Masters in Management (MiM) internationally and are often placed around top 100 Master in Management programmes across the world since inception.

One year full time MBA 
To compete on the global stage, the premier IIMs found the necessity to start MBA programmes that would be ranked globally at par with MBA programme like Harvard and Wharton. Within a decade of their inception, the one year MBA programmes have catapulted the position of the top IIMs within top 50 global MBA list. as Since 2006, IIM Ahmedabad, IIM Bangalore, IIM Calcutta, IIM Lucknow, IIM Indore, IIM Kozhikode, IIM Shillong and IIM Udaipur have started offering the one-year, full-time postgraduate programmes for professionals having approximately 5 years or more of work experience, which are a unique addition to the bucket of flagship programmes which adds experienced professionals who add valued experience to the system of full-time MBA.

One-year programme was necessitated because the normal 2-year program is primarily aimed at new graduates or graduates with less than 4–5 years of work experience. The1-year programmes are general, fully integrated management programmes with no specialization, and typically include the same courses as offered in a typical 2-year MBA program. These intensive programmes typically require 75 credits or around 750 hours of classroom teaching along with projects and other coursework as in a normal 2-year MBA program. The flagship 1-year MBA programmes offered by IIMs at Bangalore, Ahmedabad and Calcutta are often termed as Global MBAs internationally and have been ranked within top 50 Global MBA programmes across the world since their inception.

Designed as a regular MBA programme, which focuses on using the prior work experience of the students, the one-year Executive MBA is named differently by different IIMs. It is called Post Graduate Program for Executives at IIM Calcutta and IIM Shillong (PGPEX for short), and at IIM Ahmedabad and IIM Udaipur (PGPX for short). It is called Executive Post Graduate Programme (EPGP) at IIM Bangalore and IIM Indore, and International Programme in Management for Executives (IPMX) at IIM Lucknow. All these programmes admit only candidates with approximately 5 or more years of professional experience and usually use a combination of GMAT score, essays, and personal interviews as entry criteria, similar to other globally reputed MBA programmes. The median GMAT score of the batches at IIM Ahmedabad, Bangalore, Calcutta, Indore and IIM Udaipur is usually above 700 and compares with the best in the world.

Other specialty full time MBA programmes 
Other than these general variants, many IIMs offer specialty programmes built which focus on different areas, e.g. Post Graduate Programme in Sustainable Management (PGP-SM) at IIM Lucknow, Post Graduate Programme in Human Resource Management (PGPHRM) at IIM Ranchi and many more.

Five-year Integrated Management Programme (Undergraduate/Postgraduate Education) 

Five IIMs, IIM Indore and IIM Rohtak, IIM Jammu, IIM Bodh Gaya and IIM Ranchi also offer five-year integrated programs. Students join this program after high school (class XII). The program is called IPM (Integrated Programme in Management) at both the institutes. The course structures are similar though not same at both the institutes. For three years, students focus on  "statistics, economics and humanities", joining the post-graduate cohort in years 4 and 5. IIM Indore established its program in 2011 and IIM Rohtak in 2019. They were followed by IIM Ranchi, IIM Jammu and IIM Bodhgaya in 2021. IIM Indore awards program graduates both BA (Foundations of Management) and MBA. IIM Rohtak awards the BBA/MBA to five-year graduates and BBA to students who opt-out after three years.

Fellow Programme in Management (DBA) 
IIMs offer a Fellow Programme in Management (FPM) as a full-time DBA Programme . This programme is aimed at preparing students for careers in teaching or research in different disciplines of management, as well as for careers outside academics that demand a high degree of investigative and analytical ability. A student who completes this programme at any IIM, where (s)he is registered as a doctoral scholar, is awarded the title of Fellow Member (e.g. Fellow Member of the Indian Institutes of Management). This Fellow Programme is equivalent to the DBA degree. Students receiving such a fellowship every year, across all IIMs, work in close association with one another in specific research areas of their choice.

Executive Management Programme 
Many IIMs offer Executive MBA programme targeted at working professionals. These are often short-term or part-time programmes and are known by various names such as  Management Development Programme (MDP), Advanced Masters Program in Management of Global Enterprises (AMPM), and Executive General Management Programme (EGMP). The certificate programmes at IIMs are not considered equivalent to an Executive MBA offered by the IIMs . Only the diploma-level programmes are considered equivalent, depending on whether it is full-time or part-time. Many IIMs—such as IIMC, IIMB, IIMK, IIM Kashipur, and IIM Rohtak—have partnered with third-party companies to enable these courses to be provided under a distributed model.

Other programmes 
Some IIMs offer specialised programmes targeted at various management segments. IIM Ahmedabad offers a six-month, full-time programme called the Armed Forces Programme (AFP) aimed at military personnel. IIM Ahmedabad and IIM Bangalore offer full-time programmes in public administration  and public policy are called the Post Graduate Programme in Public Management and Policy (PGP-PMP) and Post Graduate Programme in Public Policy Management (PGPPM), respectively for civil servants of the Indian Administrative Service cadre. IIM Bangalore offers a two-year, part-time programme called the Post-Graduate Programme in Software Enterprise Management (PGPSEM), an executive general-management education programme designed for the specific needs of professionals working in the software and information technology industry. IIM Indore offers a 5-year Integrated Programme in Management (IPM) that leads to a combined undergraduate-cum-graduate diploma. IIM Ranchi is the first and only IIM to offer a full-time Post Graduate Diploma in Human Resource Management (PGDHRM) programme. IIM Bangalore offers a two-year Mahatma Gandhi National Fellowship to "promote skill development in district economies".

Admission process 
Different programmes of IIMs follow different admission processes. Admission for residents of India to the two-year PGP programmes at all IIMs is based on the Common Admission Test (CAT). CAT scores are often used as the primary short-listing criteria for admissions. International/overseas applicants have the option to apply using GMAT scores in lieu of CAT scores. GMAT scores are a prerequisite short-listing criteria used for admission to the one-year full-time programme for experienced executives. Test requirements for doctoral programmes vary. Some IIMs require candidates to make a presentation of a broad research idea or take a Research Aptitude Test (RAT) followed by a round of interviews while all are compelled to accept scores on standardised tests such as the CAT, GATE, GMAT, and GRE. The overall profiles of candidates, including past academic and professional accomplishments, are considered for all programmes, along with valid standard test scores. Some programmes require essays and academic or professional recommendations. The final round of admission evaluations involves an interview, before which some IIMs conduct other evaluation processes like written assessment tests and group discussions.

Entrance exam 

The Common Admission Test (CAT) is a management aptitude test conducted by the IIMs primarily as an evaluation tool for admission to their two-year PGP programmes. It is widely considered one of the most competitive exams in the world, with a success rate of around one in two hundred. Even with the recent addition of new colleges, in 2013 the acceptance rate at IIMs was 1.714%, one of the lowest in the world.

Originally conducted as a paper-and-pencil test given on a particular date all over India, in 2009 CAT began being given as a computer-based assessment operated by Prometric. In 2014, TCS received a 5-year contract to conduct the test. The online test is now given over a period of a few weeks.

In August 2011, the six newer IIMs (Raipur, Rohtak, Ranchi, Udaipur, Trichy and Kashipur) announced that in the coming year they will replace the group-discussion round with a common written analysis test to evaluate communication and comprehension skill. The seven older IIMs did not announce plans to change the admission process.

The admissions for the two-year full-time programme is done by shortlisting based on GMAT scores in conjunction with candidate profile suitability. This is followed by evaluation of essays and a panel-interview round. The quality of prior work experience and future leadership potential is a critical factor in the selections.

Reservation policy 
IIMs also follow a quota system, as per the provisions of the Indian constitution. As per the provisions, 15% of the seats are reserved for students of Scheduled Castes, and 7.5% for Scheduled Tribes. Since 2008, the Other Backward Classes have also been given 27% reservation, after the Supreme Court of India upheld the validity of relevant government regulation. The provisions are being implemented in a phased manner due to resource constraints. All aspirants have to take the Common Admission Test which consists of an objective-type exam, a group-discussion round, and personal interviews, with the cut-off for reserved-category candidates being possibly lower than for general-category candidates. Once admitted to a programme, a reserved category student has to meet all the criteria for completing the programme as a general-category student. Regular counselling sessions, extra classes, and tutorials, by senior students, for needy students are a regular feature of the IIMs. IIMs provide financial support to needy and deserving students in the form of scholarships.

Course Fees 
By 2016, the fee was almost . Inflation in India has been cited as one of the reasons for the fee hikes at IIMs.

Post-graduate program fees 
The IIM post graduation program fees structure varies from —at IIM Amritsar, a more recent institute—to —at IIM Ahmedabad and Bangalore. The second highest fees, totaling , are for IIM Kolkata and IIM Bangalore. Most of the IIM's fees are in the  range: IIMs Vizag, Trichy, Ranchi, Sambalpur, Sirmaur, Jammu, Udaipur, Kashipur, and Nagpur.

Executive program fees 
IIM run several executive programs for working executives and professionals. IIM Lucknow's new 6-month data analytics program costs  while its analytics program for finance professionals costs .

See also
 Indian Institutes of Technology
 Indian Ethos in Management

Explanatory Notes

References

External links

 IIM, Ministry of Education, Government of India
 Common Admission Test

 
Business schools in India